Nicholas Robert Michael de Lange (born 7 August 1944) is a British Reform rabbi and historian. He is Professor of Hebrew and Jewish Studies at the University of Cambridge.

Academic and literary career 
Nicholas de Lange is an emeritus fellow at Wolfson College, Cambridge. He has written and edited several books about Judaism and  translated numerous works of fiction by Amos Oz, S. Yizhar and A. B. Yehoshua into English.  In November 2007, he received the Risa Domb/Porjes Prize for Translation from the Hebrew for his translation of A Tale of Love and Darkness by Amos Oz.

He gives lectures on Modern Judaism and the Reading of Jewish texts at the Faculty of Divinity, University of Cambridge.

Rabbinic career
De Lange is a Reform rabbi who studied with Ignaz Maybaum, a disciple of Franz Rosenzweig. He is the main rabbi of Etz Hayyim Synagogue in Chania.

Published works 
 Origen and the Jews: Studies in Jewish-Christian Relations in Third-Century Palestine (University of Cambridge Oriental Publications, 25) (1976), Cambridge University Press 
 Apocrypha: Jewish Literature of the Hellenistic Age (Jewish Heritage Classics) (1978),  New York: Viking Press 
 Atlas of the Jewish World (1984), Oxford: Phaidon Press 
 Judaism (1986), Oxford University Press
 "Jesus Christ and Auschwitz" (1997), New Blackfriars Vol. 78, No. 917/918, pp. 308–316
 An Introduction to Judaism (2000), Cambridge University Press, pp. 272 
 The Penguin Dictionary of Judaism (Penguin Reference Library) (2008), pp. 400

References

1944 births
Living people
20th-century English rabbis
20th-century British translators
21st-century English rabbis
21st-century British translators
Academics of the University of Cambridge
British historians
British Jews
British Reform rabbis
Clergy from Nottingham
English translators
Fellows of Wolfson College, Cambridge
Jewish historians
Amos Oz
People educated at Harrow High School
Scholars of Medieval Greek
Translators from Hebrew